The men's high jump at the 2021 World Athletics U20 Championships was held at the Kasarani Stadium on 21 August.

Records

Results

Final
The final was held on 21 August at 15:55.

References

High jump
High jump at the World Athletics U20 Championships